Kalyaanappanthal is a 1975 Indian Malayalam film, directed by Dr. Balakrishnan. The film stars Sudheer, Vidhubala, Vincent, Manavalan Joseph, Pattom Sadan and Sankaradi in the lead roles. The film has musical score by A. T. Ummer.

Cast
 
Sudheer
Vincent
Vidhubala
Rajakokila
Sadhana 
Surasu 
KPAC Lalitha 
Manavalan Joseph 
Pattom Sadan 
Sankaradi 
Kuthiravattam Pappu
T. R. Omana
Paravoor Bharathan
Cochin Haneefa 
Nilambur Balan 
T. S. Muthaiah 
Vijayan
Khadeeja 
Kunchan
Master Raghu
Unni
Unnikrishnan
Varghese  
Bhargavan
Japan 
Kunnamkulam Jose 
Laila
Lissy
M. M. Sebastian  
N. S. Mani  
Ramadas
Swapna
T. V. George 
Treesa  
Vijaya 
Chithra

Soundtrack
The music was composed by A. T. Ummer.

References

External links
 

1975 films
1970s Malayalam-language films